The 2019 season was Petaling Jaya City's 1st season of competitive football, the top division of Malaysian football and in the Malaysia Super League since rebranded in 2019. The season covers the period from 1 February 2019 to 21 July 2019.

Players

Transfers

In
1st leg

2nd leg

Out
1st leg

2nd leg

Loans out
1st leg

2nd leg

Competitions

Malaysia Super League

League table

Results by matchday

Matches
The Malaysian Football League (MFL) announced the fixtures for the 2019 season on 22 December 2018.

Malaysia FA Cup

Malaysia Cup

Group stage

Friendlies

Squad statistics

Appearances and goals

|-
! colspan=14 style=background:#dcdcdc; text-align:center| Goalkeepers

|-
! colspan=14 style=background:#dcdcdc; text-align:center| Defenders

|-
! colspan=14 style=background:#dcdcdc; text-align:center| Midfielders

|-
! colspan=14 style=background:#dcdcdc; text-align:center| Forwards

|-
! colspan=14 style=background:#dcdcdc; text-align:center| Players away from the club on loan or left the club

Disciplinary record

References

Petaling Jaya City FC
Petaling Jaya City FC seasons
Petaling Jaya City